The Florida Basketball Association (FBA) is a semi-professional men's basketball league that began play in the fall of 2012 with teams in Orlando, Lake Wales, and Palm Beach Gardens.

The commissioner of the FBA is former NBA player Greg Kite.

History
The inaugural season of 2012 was played with four teams. Tampa Bay Rebels defeated Heartland Prowl to win the first FBA championship.

The Rebels (10-2) and Prowl (9-3) dominated league play in 2013 and met in the championship game once again. Heartland Prowl avenged their first season loss by defeating Tampa Bay 111-109. Prowl forward Arnold Lewis was named FBA Finals MVP, scoring 27 points.

In October 2013 the owners of the FBA voted to accept the expansion application of the Miami Midnites, owned by Jeffrey Rosen. Rosen also owns Maccabi Haifa B.C. of the Israeli Basketball Premier League.

Miami (11-1) stormed through the 2014 season, losing just once (104-103) to Tampa Bay on May 25, 2014. The teams met in the championship game in August with the Midnites capturing the FBA title in their inaugural season.

In October 2014 the expansion Marion County Showtime Stallions were added as a FBA member. Marion County played out of Ocala in the 2015 season, but ceased operations before the end of their season.

Miami Midnites repeated as FBA champion in 2015, finishing with a perfect 14-0 record. Guard Amir Celestin was named MVP after scoring a game-high 39 points, 7 assists, 5 rebounds and 3 steals. After the season Celestin signed a three-year contract with Maccabi Haifa B.C.

Space Coast Stars were announced as the newest FBA expansion club in October 2015. The Stars are owned by former FBA player (Florida Flight) Corey Williams, who also serves as head boys basketball coach at Bethany Christian School in Melbourne (home of the Stars). Just before the new season Tampa Bay Saints were added after the Heartland Prowl ceased operations.

Teams

Former teams 
Poinciana Pride (2018-2022)
Bradenton GymRats (2015-2017)
 Heartland Prowl (2012-15)
 Jacksonville Royals (2017-2018)
 Marion County Showtime Stallions (2015)
Miami Midnites (2014-2016)
 Palm Beach Titans (2013)
Space Coast Stars (2016-2019)
 Tampa Bay Rebels (2012-14)

Champions

References

External links 
 
 FBA blog
Florida Flight
 Palm Beach Knights

Basketball leagues in the United States
Basketball in Florida
2012 establishments in Florida